Usta grantae is a species of moth in the family Saturniidae. It is found in Tanzania.

Taxonomy
Usta grantae is treated as a subspecies of Usta terpsichore by some sources or as a subspecies or synonym of Usta subangulata by others.

References

Moths described in 1991
grantae